Leptoxis clipeata, the agate rocksnail, was a freshwater snail in the family Pleuroceridae. Like all Leptoxis, the species required free-flowing unpolluted water. It was endemic to parts of the Coosa River in Alabama, now impounded.

References

clipeata
Extinct gastropods
Gastropods described in 1922
Taxonomy articles created by Polbot